The Psychodynamic Model of Emotional and behavioral disorders is a Freudian psychoanalytic theory which posits that emotional damage occurs when the child's need for safety, affection, acceptance, and self-esteem has been effectively thwarted by the parent (or primary caregiver). 

The child becomes unable to function efficiently, cannot adapt to reasonable requirements of social regulation and convention, or is so plagued with inner conflict, anxiety, and guilt that they are unable to perceive reality clearly or meet the ordinary demands of the environment in which they live.

Karen Horney has postulated three potential character patterns stemming from these conditions: compliant and submissive behavior, and a need for love: arrogance, hostility, and a need for power; or social avoidance, withdrawal, and a need for independence.

Theories

Psychoanalytic Theory: Freud 
Sigmund Freud was a physician whose fascination with the emotional problems of his patients led him to develop a new branch of psychological theory.
He found from his own experimental researching that the personality has three major systems of psychic energy: the id, the ego, and the superego.
According to Freud, we all are born with what we call the id. The id is like “the kid in us.” It represents the inner world of subjective experience and has no knowledge of objective reality. It is said to operate for pleasure and reduce tension and pain.
The ego is differentiated out of the id and develops out of a need to temper the subjective view of the id with the objective world of reality; it is the part of the id that has been modified by the external world.
The superego represents the moral standards imposed upon a child by society, which are enforced by parents and other societal agents. It has two aspects: the positive (ego ideal), which rewards, and the negative (conscience), which punishes. The superego strives towards perfection.
The next two tables have been produced by Freud as other theories:

Principle Defense Mechanisms of the Ego

Adjustment Problems Based on Fixations at Psychosexual Stages

Neo-Freudian Theory: Horney and Erikson
Karen Horney and Erik Erikson were both psychoanalysts that were greatly influenced by Sigmund Freud’s theories. Horney believes that as a child struggles with anxiety and the security issue, various behavioral strategies may be tried and eventually a character pattern will be adopted. She postulated three such character patterns: (1) moving toward people, characterized by compliance, submissive behavior, and a need for love; (2) moving against people, characterized by arrogance, hostility, and a need for power; and (3) moving away from people, characterized by social avoidance, withdrawal, and a need for independence.
Erik Erikson viewed the ego not as an extension of the id, but as autonomous both in origin and function. The environmental and societal values are central to this new view of the ego, a view that resulted in “the addition of an entire social and cultural dimension to the concept of personality growth.”  Erikson's benefaction to the knowledge of disordered behavior centers around his concepts of crisis and the importance of crisis resolution during critical periods of development. He proposed eight stages of psychosocial development shown in the table below.

Erikson's Psychosocial Stages

References

Psychodynamics